The Roemer- und Pelizaeus-Museum Hildesheim is an archaeological museum in Hildesheim, Germany. Mostly dedicated to ancient Egyptian and ancient Peruvian art, the museum also includes the second largest collection of Chinese porcelain in Europe. Furthermore, the museum owns collections of natural history, ethnology, applied arts, drawings and prints, local history and arts, as well as archeology. Apart from the permanent exhibitions, the museum hosts temporary exhibitions of other archaeological and contemporary topics.

In 2000, the old building, originally built in the 1950s, was replaced by a  new building, significantly increasing the space available for exhibitions.

The current museum is the result of the union of the Roemer Museum, founded in 1844 (and named after one of the founders, Herrmann Roemer), and the Pelizaeus Museum, established in 1911, that had housed the private collection of Egyptian antiques of Wilhelm Pelizaeus.

Gallery

External links

 

Archaeological museums in Germany
Museums in Lower Saxony
Egyptological collections in Germany
Art museums and galleries in Germany
Buildings and structures in Hildesheim
Tourist attractions in Hildesheim
Museums established in 1844
1844 establishments in Germany
Museums established in 1911
1911 establishments in Germany